Florence Billings (born 1895) was an American film actress of the silent era.

Selected filmography

 The Spreading Dawn (1917)
 By Right of Purchase (1918)
 The Fair Pretender (1918)
 Woman (1918)
 A Romance of the Air (1918)
 The Great Victory (1919)
 Her Game (1919)
 The Probation Wife (1919)
 Her Game (1919)
 The Woman Game (1920)
 The Blue Pearl (1920)
 The Road of Ambition (1920)
 The Wonder Man (1920)
 The Wakefield Case (1921)
 Handcuffs or Kisses (1921)
 Nobody (1921)
 Worlds Apart (1921)
 Why Announce Your Marriage? (1922)
 Love's Masquerade (1922)
 Who Are My Parents? (1922)
 Destiny's Isle (1922)
 What Fools Men Are (1922)
 Marriage Morals (1923)
 For Another Woman (1924)
 Sinners in Heaven (1924)
 Damaged Hearts (1924)
 Greater Than Marriage (1924)
 Miss Bluebeard (1925)
 The Heart of a Siren (1925)

References

Bibliography
 Goble, Alan. The Complete Index to Literary Sources in Film. Walter de Gruyter, 1999.

External links

1895 births
Year of death unknown
American film actresses
Actresses from New York City